Michael Anthony Sealy (born 6 January 1984) is a Hong Kong former professional footballer.

Personal life
He is the son of former footballer Tony Sealy, and brother of former Hong Kong international footballer Jack Sealy.

Career statistics

Club

Notes

References

External links
 Yau Yee Football League profile

Living people
1984 births
Hong Kong people of English descent
Hong Kong footballers
English footballers
Association football midfielders
Hong Kong First Division League players
Hong Kong Premier League players
Hong Kong FC players